Fatteshikast is a 2019 Indian Marathi language historical drama film directed by Digpal Lanjekar and produced under the banner of Almonds Creations in association with A A Films. The film stars Chinmay Mandlekar, Mrinal Kulkarni, Sameer Dharmadhikari, along with Ankit Mohan and Mrunmayee Deshpande in supporting roles. The music of the film is composed by Devdutta Manisha Baji and the soundtrack includes devotional song of Sant Tukaram. It's the second movie of the series in an eight movies series on Maratha Empire. It was followed by the movie Pawankhind.

Plot summary
The film depicts the historical encounter between Chatrapati Shivaji Maharaj and the subahdar and general of the Mughal army, Shaista Khan at Lal Mahal in Pune.

Cast 
 Chinmay Mandlekar as Chatrapati Shivaji Maharaj 
 Mrinal Kulkarni as Rajmata Jijabai 
 Ajay Purkar as Subhedar Tanaji Malusare
 Sameer Dharmadhikari as Naamdar Khan
 Anup Soni as Shaista Khan
 Rishi Saxena as Fatteh Khan
 Ankit Mohan as Sarsenapati Yesaji Kank
 Mrunmayee Deshpande as Kesar (Phulwanti)
 Vikram Gaikwad as Sardar Chimnaji Mudgal Deshpande
 Nikhil Raut as Kisna
 Prasad Limaye as  Sardar Balaji Mudgal Deshpande
 Harish Dudhade as Bahirji Naik (spy)
 Digpal Lanjekar as Sardar Baaji Sarjerao Jedhe
 Akshay Waghmare as Sardar Koyaji Naik Bandal
 Aastad Kale as Kartalab Khan Uzbek
 Trupti Toradmal as Rai Bagan Sahiba
 Ruchi Savarn as Maharani Soyarabai
 Nakshatra Medhekar as Bahubegam (daughter in law of Shaista Khan)
 Ramesh Paradeshi as Amar Singh Rathore
 Ganesh Tidke as Suryaji Malusare

Production
The principal photography began on 30 April 2019.

Release
The film was theatrically released on 15 November 2019.

Box office
Fatteshikast had a decent opening at the box office.

Soundtrack

The songs for the film are composed by  Devdutta Manisha Baji and lyrics by Sant Tukaram, V. S. Khandekar and Digpal Lanjhekar.

References

External links 
 
 Fatteshikast at ZEE5

2019 films
Indian historical drama films
2010s historical drama films
2010s Marathi-language films
Films set in the Maratha Empire
2019 drama films